The Ministerial Conference is the top decision making body of the World Trade Organization (WTO). There have been twelve ministerial conferences from 1996 to 2022, usually every two years.

Ministerial conferences

First ministerial conference

The inaugural ministerial conference was held in Singapore in 1996. Its primary purpose was to initiate an international effort among global trading nations to overhaul the structure and mechanisms of the General Agreement on Tariffs and Trade (GATT) while preserving the considerable progress and success achieved by that system since its inception in 1948.

Disagreements, largely between developed and developing economies, emerged over four issues initiated by this conference; afterward, these were collectively referred to as the "Singapore issues".

Second ministerial conference

Was held in Geneva in Switzerland.

Third ministerial conference

The third conference in Seattle, United States ended in failure, with massive demonstrations and police and National Guard crowd control efforts drawing worldwide attention.

Fourth ministerial conference

The fourth conference was held in Doha In Persian Gulf nation of Qatar. The Doha Development Round was launched at the conference. The conference also approved the joining of China, which became the 143rd member to join.

Fifth ministerial conference

The ministerial conference was held in Cancún, Mexico, aiming at forging agreement on the Doha round. An alliance of 22 southern states, the G20 (led by India, China and Brazil), resisted demands from the North for agreements on the so-called "Singapore issues" and called for an end to agricultural subsidies within the EU and the US. The talks broke down without progress.

Sixth ministerial conference

The sixth WTO Conference Ministerial was held in Hong Kong from 13 December – 18 December 2005. It was considered vital if the four-year-old Doha Development Agenda negotiations were to move forward sufficiently to conclude the round in 2006. In this meeting, countries agreed to phase out all their agricultural export subsidies by the end of 2013, and terminate any cotton export subsidies by the end of 2006. Further concessions to developing countries included an agreement to introduce duty-free, tariff-free access for goods from the Least Developed Countries, following the Everything But Arms initiative of the European Union — but with up to 3% of tariff lines exempted. Other major issues were left for further negotiation to be completed by the end of 2006.

Seventh ministerial conference

Was held 30 November – 2 December 2009 in Geneva, Switzerland. The general theme for discussion was "The WTO, the Multilateral Trading System and the Current Global Economic Environment".

Eighth ministerial conference

Was held 15–17 December 2011 in Geneva, Switzerland. Membership agreement were made for Russia, Samoa, and Montenegro.

Ninth ministerial conference

Was held 3–6 December 2013 in Bali, Indonesia. 159 members of World Trade Organization agreed to the Bali Package which eases barriers to international trade.

Tenth ministerial conference 

The WTO's 10th Ministerial Conference was held in Nairobi, Kenya, from 15 to 19 December 2015. The completion of Afghanistan and Liberia's accession to the WTO was on the agenda. It culminated in the adoption of the "Nairobi Package", a series of six Ministerial Decisions on agriculture, cotton and issues related to least-developed countries (LDCs). The Conference was chaired by Kenya's Cabinet Secretary for Foreign Affairs and International Trade, Amina Mohamed.

Eleventh ministerial conference 

The WTO's 11th Ministerial Conference was held in Buenos Aires, Argentina, from 11 to 13 December 2017.  It was chaired by Minister Susana Malcorra of Argentina. The Conference ended with a number of ministerial decisions, including on fisheries subsidies and e-commerce duties, and a commitment to continue negotiations in all areas.

Twelfth ministerial conference 
The agreement to host the 12th WTO Ministerial Conference in Nur-Sultan, Kazakhstan was signed on October 30, 2019. The Ministerial Conference was scheduled for June 8-11, 2020, but was postponed and took place in June 2022 in Geneva, Switzerland, due to the COVID-19 pandemic. It ran from 12 to 17 June 2022: although it was initially scheduled to end on 15 June, the meeting was extended by two days to allow more time for negotiations.

13th ministerial conference
Two proposals have been received to host the thirteenth Ministerial Conference, from Cameroon and from the United Arab Emirates.

Doha Round

The WTO launched the current round of negotiations, the Doha Development Agenda (DDA) or Doha Round, at the Fourth Ministerial Conference in Doha, Qatar in November 2001. The Doha round was to be an ambitious effort to make globalization more inclusive and help the world's poor, particularly by slashing barriers and subsidies in farming. The initial agenda comprised both further trade liberalization and new rule-making, underpinned by commitments to strengthen substantial assistance to developing countries.

The negotiations have been highly contentious and agreement has not been reached, despite the intense negotiations at several Ministerial Conferences and at other sessions. , disagreements still continued over several key areas including  agriculture subsidies.

See also
 World Bank
 International Monetary Fund
 International Trade Organization
 Bretton Woods system

References

External links
 Official WTO Ministerial Conference page

World Trade Organization
20th-century diplomatic conferences
21st-century diplomatic conferences